Netherhope Halt was a railway station on the former Wye Valley Railway. It was opened in 1932 and closed in 1959; it was demolished soon afterwards.

References

Former Great Western Railway stations
Disused railway stations in Gloucestershire
Railway stations in Great Britain opened in 1932
Railway stations in Great Britain closed in 1959
Tidenham